Luka Stankovski (born 2 September 2002) is a Macedonian professional footballer who plays as a midfielder for Slovenian club Gorica, on loan from Turkish club Gaziantep.

Club career

Rabotnički 
Born in Skopje, Macedonia, Stankovski began his youth career at Vardar, before moving to Rabotnički in 2015. He made his senior debut in the Macedonian First League on 31 August 2019, playing as a starter in a 2–1 defeat to Akademija Pandev.

Stankovski's first goal came on 29 August 2020, aged 17, helping his side draw 1–1 to Vardar. On 16 December, he scored a brace against Borec in a 2–1 win. Stanskovski finished the 2020–21 season with eight goals in 29 league appearances.

Gaziantep 
On 12 January 2022, Stankovski joined Turkish Süper Lig club Gaziantep, signing a four-and-a-half-year contract, with an option for a further year. He made his debut in a 2–0 league defeat to İstanbul Başakşehir on 12 February 2022.

In February 2023, Stankovski moved to Slovenian PrvaLiga club Gorica on a temporary loan, as Gaziantep withdrew from the 2022–23 Süper Lig season due to the 2023 Turkey–Syria earthquake.

International career 
Stankovski represented Macedonia internationally at under-17 level in the 2019 UEFA European Under-17 Championship qualifiers.

Style of play 

Personal life 
Stankovski is the son of former footballer Goran Stankovski.

Career statistics

Club

References

External links
 Profile at Gaziantep F.K.

2002 births
Living people
Footballers from Skopje
Macedonian footballers
Association football midfielders
FK Vardar players
FK Rabotnički players
Gaziantep F.K. footballers
ND Gorica players
Macedonian First Football League players
Süper Lig players
Slovenian PrvaLiga players
North Macedonia youth international footballers
North Macedonia under-21 international footballers
Macedonian expatriate footballers
Macedonian expatriate sportspeople in Turkey
Expatriate footballers in Turkey
Macedonian expatriate sportspeople in Slovenia
Expatriate footballers in Slovenia